Picnic Day is a public holiday in the Northern Territory of Australia which takes place every year on the first Monday of August.

History

Picnic Day events in the Northern Territory date back to the late 1800s. They were held in a variety of locations such as Adelaide River, Brunette Downs Station and Glencoe Paddock at differing times of year.

A regular annual Union Picnic Day or Trade Picnic Day was observed at Adelaide River by railway employees working on the North Australia Railway. The date of the first event is not known. The event included Public Works employees on some occasions. Between 1926 and 1935 a railway Picnic Day event was not held. An attempt was made to revive the holiday in 1933, but it was not officially observed again until three years later. On Monday 5 October 1936, a train transported people from Darwin to Adelaide River, leaving at 7 am returning at 11 pm. The hotel at Adelaide River recorded record sales and the train was "forced to stop often as a number of male Darwin passengers fell off at various points along the line".

The Harts Range Races in Central Australia are held each Picnic Day long weekend. The races began in 1946, when three brothers Bennett, Qinton and Kil Webb from Mount Riddock Station raced stockman Jack Schaber and the regional policeman Senior Constable Bob Darken over a distance of about a mile to the Ulgarna Yards to determine who had the fastest horse. The event inspired the first formal racing meet at Harts Range in November 1947. It became an annual event.

Notes

References

Culture of the Northern Territory
Public holidays in Australia
August observances
Holidays and observances by scheduling (nth weekday of the month)
Day (Australian holiday)